Geoffrey Forsaith (born 5 January 1931) is an Australian cricketer. He played one first-class match for Western Australia in 1961/62.

References

External links
 

1931 births
Living people
Australian cricketers
Western Australia cricketers
Cricketers from Perth, Western Australia